Bohadschia vitiensis is a species of sea cucumber in the family Holothuriidae. It is also known as the brown sandfish and brown sea cucumber. It is widespread in shallow waters of the Indo-Pacific. It appears to be able to hybridize with Bohadschia argus.

It is harvested commercially, which has led to local depletions.

References

Holothuriidae
Fauna of the Indian Ocean
Fauna of the Pacific Ocean
Animals described in 1868